John Barry Anthony Gill (born 3 February 1941) is an English former professional footballer who played in the Football League for Hartlepools United and Mansfield Town.

References

1941 births
Living people
English footballers
Association football defenders
English Football League players
Nottingham Forest F.C. players
Mansfield Town F.C. players
Hartlepool United F.C. players
Nuneaton Borough F.C. players
Atherstone Town F.C. players